The Nevada Group is an abandoned term for a geologic group in Nevada. The group, reflected a collection of rocks then thought to preserve fossils dating back to the Devonian period.

The term was abandoned as a geologic unit because it is "a collection of distinctive rock units deposited in variety of depositional environments."

See also

 List of fossiliferous stratigraphic units in Nevada
 Paleontology in Nevada

References

Geologic groups of Nevada
Devonian System of North America